Qinghui Garden, located in Daliang, Shunde District, Foshan City, is one of the Four Great Gardens of Guangdong in China.

See also
 List of Chinese gardens

References 

Gardens in Guangdong
Shunde District